Wait Until Dark is a 1967 American psychological thriller film directed by Terence Young and produced by Mel Ferrer, from a screenplay by Robert Carrington and Jane-Howard Carrington, based on the 1966 play of the same name by Frederick Knott. The film stars Audrey Hepburn as a blind woman, Alan Arkin as a violent criminal searching for some drugs, and Richard Crenna as another criminal, supported by Jack Weston, Julie Herrod, and Efrem Zimbalist Jr.

Audrey Hepburn was nominated for the Academy Award for Best Actress in 1967, and Zimbalist was nominated for a Golden Globe in the supporting category. The film is ranked #55 on AFI's 2001 100 Years...100 Thrills list, and its climax is ranked tenth on Bravo's 100 Scariest Movie Moments.

Plot 
A woman named Lisa (Samantha Jones) takes a flight from Montreal to New York City, smuggling bags of heroin sewn inside an old-fashioned doll. When she disembarks, Lisa becomes worried upon seeing a man watching her at the airport and gives the doll to a fellow passenger, professional photographer Sam Hendrix (Efrem Zimbalist Jr.), for safekeeping. She is roughly escorted away by the other man.

A few days later, con artists Mike Talman (Richard Crenna) and Carlino (Jack Weston) arrive at the apartment of Sam and his blind wife, Susy (Audrey Hepburn), believing it to be Lisa's residence. Harry Roat (Alan Arkin), the man who met Lisa at the airport, arrives to persuade Talman and Carlino to help him find the doll. After the con men discover Lisa's body, Roat blackmails them into helping him dispose of it and convinces them to help him find the doll. While Sam is on a photography assignment, the criminals begin an elaborate con game, using Susy's blindness against her and posing as different people to win her trust. Implying that Lisa has been murdered and that Sam will be suspected, the men persuade Susy to help them find the doll. Mike gives her the number for the phone booth across the street as his own after falsely warning her of a police car outside.

Gloria (Julie Herrod), a girl who lives upstairs and who had borrowed the doll earlier, sneaks in to return it. She reveals to Susy that there is no police car outside. After calling Mike and realizing it is the phone booth's number, Susy realizes that the three are criminals and hides the doll. She tells them that the doll is at Sam's studio and the three leave after Roat cuts the telephone cord. Carlino stays behind to stand guard outside the building. Susy sends Gloria to the bus station to wait for Sam. When she discovers that the telephone cord has been cut, she prepares to defend herself by breaking all the lightbulbs in the apartment except for that of the safelight. When Mike returns, he realizes that she knows the truth and demands the doll, but she refuses to cooperate. Mike admits to Susy that he and his confederates are part of a criminal plot, while Roat is the particular danger. He assures her that he has sent Carlino to kill Roat. However, having anticipated their plan, Roat has killed Carlino instead, and he then kills Mike on the doorstep of Susy's apartment.

Intent on acquiring the doll, Roat threatens to set the apartment on fire. Susy finally agrees to give him the doll but throws a chemical at Roat's face and unplugs the safelight as the apartment is plunged into darkness. Roat uses matches to see, but Susy douses him with gasoline, forcing him to put out the match. Roat finally produces light by opening the refrigerator. Susy, realizing that she has lost the battle, pulls the doll out from its hiding place and hands it to him. While Roat is distracted with it, Susy is able to arm herself with a kitchen knife. Roat then tries to walk Susy to the bedroom, but she stabs him and flees. She is unable to escape the chained front door and stumbles toward the kitchen window to scream for help, but Roat leaps from the darkness and grabs her ankle. She wrenches free and conceals herself behind the refrigerator door. Just as he stands to stab her, she unplugs the refrigerator, leading to total darkness yet again. The police arrive with Sam and Gloria. Susy is found, unharmed, behind the refrigerator door, while the dead Roat rests nearby, disabled by a toppled shelf.

Cast

(credited cast)
 Audrey Hepburn as Susy Hendrix
 Alan Arkin as Roat / Harry Roat Jr. /  Harry Roat Sr.
 Richard Crenna as Mike Talman
 Efrem Zimbalist Jr. as Sam Hendrix
 Jack Weston as Carlino
 Samantha Jones as Lisa
 Julie Herrod as Gloria

(uncredited cast)
 Jean Del Val as The Old Man
 Frank O'Brien as Shatner
 Gary Morgan as Teenage Boy on Street
 Bill Walters as BG with Dog
 Mel Ferrer as French-Canadian Radio Speaker

Music

Soundtrack

Exhibition

To immerse viewers in the suspense of the climactic scene, movie theater owners dimmed their lights to the legal limits, and then turned them off, one by one until the audiences were in complete darkness.

Reception
The film was one of the more popular of its year, earning North American rentals of $7,350,000.

Bosley Crowther called it a "barefaced melodrama, without character revelation of any sort, outside of the demonstration of a person with the fortitude to overcome an infirmity"; he liked Hepburn's performance, saying "the sweetness with which Miss Hepburn plays the poignant role, the quickness with which she changes and the skill with which she manifests terror attract sympathy and anxiety to her and give her genuine solidity in the final scenes".

Time magazine said the film had a "better scenario, set and cast" than the play's Broadway production that preceded it, and while "the story is as full of holes as a kitchen colander", "Hepburn's honest, posture-free performance helps to suspend the audience's disbelief" and she is "immensely aided by the heavies: Jack Weston, Richard Crenna, and Alan Arkin....With virtuosity, Hepburn and Arkin collaborate to revive an old theme—The-Helpless-Girl-Against-the-Odds—that has been out of fashion since Dorothy McGuire and Barbara Stanwyck screamed for help in The Spiral Staircase and Sorry, Wrong Number.

Roger Ebert gave the movie three and a half stars and wrote "Miss Hepburn is perhaps too simple and trusting, and Alan Arkin (as a sadistic killer) is not particularly convincing in an exaggerated performance. But there are some nice, juicy passages of terror (including that famous moment when every adolescent girl in the theater screams), and after a slow start the plot does seduce you."

Rotten Tomatoes reported that 96% of critics have given the film a positive review based on 23 reviews, with an average rating of 8.04/10. The critical consensus reads: "Nail-bitingly tense and brilliantly acted, Wait Until Dark is a compact thriller that makes the most of its fiendishly clever premise." At Metacritic, the film has a weighted average score of 81 out of 100 based on 9 critics, indicating "universal acclaim". The film was ranked tenth on Bravo's 100 Scariest Movie Moments for its riveting climax.

Despite the film's acclaim and receiving an Oscar nomination, Hepburn stepped away from film acting after Wait Until Dark's release and would not appear on film again until Robin and Marian in 1976.

Accolades

American Film Institute recognition
 2001 – AFI's 100 Years... 100 Thrills – #55

See also
List of American films of 1967
 List of films featuring home invasions
 27 Mavalli Circle

References

External links
 
 
 
 
 

1967 films
1960s American films
1960s English-language films
1960s psychological thriller films
American films based on plays
American psychological thriller films
Films about blind people
Films about the illegal drug trade
Films directed by Terence Young
Films scored by Henry Mancini
Films set in apartment buildings
Films set in Montreal
Films set in New York City
Films shot in Los Angeles County, California
Films shot in Montreal
Films shot in New York City
Home invasions in film
Warner Bros. films